Philip R. Craig (December 10, 1933 – May 8, 2007) was a writer known for his Martha's Vineyard mysteries.

Biography
He was born in Santa Monica and raised on a cattle ranch near Durango, Colorado. In 1951 he attended Boston University intending to become a minister, and got a degree in 1957. While at BU, he studied poetry with Robert Lowell, who quickly persuaded him that he had no future in that field, and turned to studying prose with Gerald Warner Brace, who encouraged him to write fiction. He taught English and Journalism at Endicott College in Beverly, Massachusetts from 1962 to 1965, and at Wheelock College in Boston until 1999, at which point he retired to become a full-time writer.

He was invited to join the Olympic fencing squad, but had to decline due to a knee injury. 
He died May 8, 2007 after a brief fight with cancer. He is survived by his wife Shirley, two children (Kimberlie and James) and five grandchildren.

His first novel, Gate of Ivory, Gate of Horn, was published in 1969, and is not a part of any series.  His second and subsequent novels have all been a part of the J.W. Jackson series, all of which are set on Martha's Vineyard.

Bibliography
 Gate of Ivory, Gate of Horn (1969)
 A Beautiful Place To Die (1989)
 The Woman Who Walked Into the Sea (1991, also published as Death in Vineyard Waters)
 The Double Minded Men (1992, also published as Vineyard Deceit)
 Cliff Hanger  (1993, also published as Vineyard Fear)
 Off Season (1994)
 A Case of Vineyard Poison (1995)
 Death On a Vineyard Beach (1996)
 A Deadly Vineyard Holiday (1997)
 A Shoot on Martha's Vineyard (1998)
 A Fatal Vineyard Season (1999)
 Vineyard Blues (2000)
 Vineyard Shadows (2001)
 First Light, co-written with William G. Tapply (2001)
 Vineyard Enigma (2002)
 A Vineyard Killing (2003)
 Murder at a Vineyard Mansion (2004)
 Second Sight, co-written with William G. Tapply (2005)
 Vineyard Prey (2005)
 Dead in Vineyard Sand (2006)
 Delish: The J. W. Jackson Recipes, co-written with Shirley Prada Craig (2006)

Posthumous publications
 Vineyard Stalker (2007)
 Third Strike (2007)
 Vineyard Chill (2008)

References
Mystery Writer Philip R. Craig Penned Popular Fiction Series
Harper Collins - Philip R. Craig bio
Mystery File Blog - Philip R. Craig obituary
Philip R. Craig personal biography

External links
Philip R. Craig official website

1933 births
2007 deaths
American mystery writers
Writers from Santa Monica, California
American male novelists
20th-century American novelists
Endicott College faculty
Wheelock College faculty
20th-century American male writers
Novelists from Massachusetts